The Schuman Declaration, or Schuman Plan, was a proposal to place French and West German production of coal and steel under a single authority that later became the European Coal and Steel Community, made by the French foreign minister, Robert Schuman, on the 9th of May 1950 (now celebrated in the EU as Europe Day), the day after the fifth anniversary of the end of World War II.  The alliance would later be opened to other European countries. The ultimate goal was to pacify relations, especially between France and West Germany, through gradual political integration to be achieved by creating common interests. Schuman said that "[t]he coming together of the countries of Europe requires the elimination of the age-old opposition of France and Germany ... the solidarity in production thus established will make it plain that any war between France and Germany becomes not merely unthinkable, but materially impossible."

Konrad Adenauer, the first Chancellor of the Federal Republic of Germany, responded positively to the Declaration, as did the governments of the Netherlands, Belgium, Italy, and Luxembourg. On 18 April 1951, the six founding members signed the Treaty of Paris. It created the European Coal and Steel Community – Europe's first supranational community, which paved the way for the European Economic Community and subsequently the European Union.

Background
Following World War II, the Cold War split Europe between two spheres of influence on either side of the Iron Curtain. With the desire not to repeat the destruction seen in the First and Second World Wars, there was an inclination towards European co-operation.  For example, Winston Churchill, called for the formation of a "Council of Europe".  The United States supported greater European cooperation, and when Marshall Plan aid was announced the only condition imposed was that the aid be used by the European countries in a coordinated fashion. 

The Monnet Plan, France's plan to spur investment and modernize the French economy after World War II, created an impetus for the Schuman Plan. Prewar, France had been the world's biggest importer of coal, and the Monnet Plan anticipated coal imports from Germany. In Germany, there were concerns that France aimed to import coal from Germany "as cheaply as possible" to promote French steel production.  In France, the concern (which dated to the prewar period) was that coal would be available on more favourable terms to the German market and so provide an advantage to German industry.  Schuman aimed to prevent coal and steel firms from acting as cartels which could restrict supply by national market. The Schuman Plan would mean the pooling of markets and the expansion of production. This was viewed as a force for peace in Europe, since the single market would make a war between France and Germany "materially impossible."

Schuman promoted initiatives to unite Europe while he was the Prime Minister of France (1947–48) and foreign minister from 1948–52. He spoke about the principles of sharing European resources in a supranational union at the signing of the Statute of the Council of Europe in London, 5 May 1949.

Aims and drafting
In drafting the Schuman Declaration, Jean Monnet had input from Paul Reuter, a consultant in international law to the French foreign ministry and Professor of Law at Aix-en-Provence; and Etienne Hirsch. (The draft documents of the Declaration were published by the Jean Monnet Foundation.)

The Schuman proposal was agreed on after the French cabinet discussion on 9 May 1950. Earlier in the day, Schuman had been assured that it had the support of German Chancellor Konrad Adenauer.

The Schuman Declaration says "The coming together of the nations of Europe requires the elimination of the age-old opposition of France and Germany." The French government "proposes that Franco-German production of coal and steel as a whole be placed under a common High Authority, within the framework of an organization open to the participation of other countries of Europe." The pooling of coal and steel production should allow for a common foundation for economic development and "will make it plain that any war between France and Germany becomes not merely unthinkable, but materially impossible." Importantly, by pooling basic production and by instituting the new High Authority — whose decisions bind France, Germany and other member countries — "this proposal will lead to the realization of the first concrete foundation of a European federation indispensable to the preservation of peace."

The Declaration had several aims:
 the birth of Europe as a political entity
 to make war between member states impossible
 to encourage world peace
 to form an anti-cartel agency in the coal and steel industries of member countries
 to revitalize the European economy as a whole starting with the coal and steel sectors
 to offer production in coal and steel to the world without distinction or exception, with the aim of raising living standards and promoting international development, including in Africa.

Legacy 

The Schuman Declaration marked the beginning of post-World War II Franco-German cooperation and the re-integration of West Germany into Western Europe. Konrad Adenauer, Chancellor of West Germany, said "[t]hat's our breakthrough" in regards to the Declaration. The legacy of this initiative was the signing of the Treaty of Paris on 18 April 1951 by six European countries (France, Germany, Belgium, Italy, Luxembourg and the Netherlands). The Treaty established the European Coal and Steel Community (ECSC), the first of three European Communities, and a predecessor of the European Union.

The ECSC introduced a common market for steel and coal across the member countries, with freely set market prices, free movement of products, and without customs duties or taxes, subsidies, or restrictive practices. It set up a High Authority to monitor compliance with competition rules and ensure price transparency.

Schuman was a proponent of further European integration through an (ultimately unratified) European defence community. In 1958 he became the first President of the predecessor to the European Parliament. When he left office, the Parliament bestowed on him the title "Father of Europe". May 9 has been designated "Europe Day" to celebrate peace and unity in Europe because of the significance of the Schuman Declaration on 9 May 1950.

See also 
 Council of Europe
 History of the European Communities (1945–1957)
 Robert Schuman
 European Coal and Steel Community

Notes

Bibliography 

 Diebold, William. The Schuman plan: a study in economic cooperation, 1950–1959 (Praeger, 1959).
 Hitchcock, William I. "France, the Western Alliance, and the Origins of the Schuman Plan, 1948–1950" Diplomatic History (1997) 21#4: 603–630. DOI: https://doi.org/10.1111/1467-7709.00090
 Kaiser, Wolfram. Christian democracy and the origins of European Union (Cambridge UP, 2007).
 Lovett, A. W. "The United States and the Schuman Plan. a study in French diplomacy 1950–1952." Historical Journal 39#2 (1996): 425–455.
 McDougall, Walter. "Political Economy versus National Sovereignty: French Structures for German Economic Integration after Versailles." The Journal of Modern History 51#1 (1979): 4–23.
 Mahant, Edelgard Elsbeth. Birthmarks of Europe: the origins of the European Community reconsidered (Gower Publishing, 2004).
 Scheingold, Stuart A. The rule of law in European integration: The path of the Schuman Plan (Quid Pro Books, 2013).
 Shore, Cris. "Inventing the 'People's Europe': Critical Approaches to European Community 'Cultural Policy.'" Man 28, no. 4. (Dec., 1993): 779–800.
 Shore, Cris and Annabel Black. "The European Communities and the Construction of Europe." Anthropology Today 8, no. 3. (Jun., 1992): 10–11.
 Schuman, Robert. Pour l'Europe (Paris 1963).
 Vernon, Raymond. "The Schuman Plan: Sovereign Powers of the European Coal and Steel Community." American Journal of International Law 47.2 (1953): 183–202. in JSTOR

External links 

EUROPA – Declaration of 9 May 1950
Schuman Project gives Schuman's pre-Declaration speeches and the full text of Declaration (including introduction) in English with analysis.
Video of the 9 May 1950 declaration (French) European Navigator
The 9th may's declaration : which past for an inheritance?, on "EUROS DU VILLAGE" 

1950 documents
1950 in Europe
Politics of Europe
Declarations of the European Union
Articles containing video clips
May 1950 events in Europe
1950 in international relations
France–Germany relations
Jean Monnet